is a title that was given in Japan from the beginning of the Edo period until the Meiji Restoration. In that period it was the highest official standing that could be attained by a go player. Literally it is a metonym, meaning the 'go office'.
The title was created by Tokugawa Ieyasu and was given by the Jisha-bugyō (Commissioner of Temples and Shrines). The Godokoro was required to be a Meijin and to be the best player in the land. 

The Godokoro was responsible for approving rank promotions, mediating disputes between the Four go houses, being a Go tutor to the shōgun, approving terms of challenge matches, and keeping the Go world running smoothly. The position was a lifetime commitment because the man who held the position was excused from playing any games that would cause him to lose the position of Godokoro or Meijin.

External links

Edo period
History of Go